Annissa Essaibi George (born December 12, 1973) is an American politician who served as an at-large member of the Boston City Council. First elected in 2015, she served on the council from 2016 to 2022. She was a candidate in the 2021 Boston mayoral election and advanced to the runoff election before losing the election to fellow city councilor Michelle Wu.

Early life
Annissa Essaibi George was born on December 12, 1973, in Boston, Massachusetts. Her parents met while studying in Paris. Her mother was born to Polish parents in a displaced persons camp in Germany but grew up in Boston. Her father, Ezzeddine, was from Tunisia. They relocated to the United States in 1972, settling in the Dorchester neighborhood of Boston. She and her three siblings were raised Catholic while her father was a practicing Muslim.

After graduating from Boston Technical High School (now the John D. O'Bryant School of Mathematics & Science), Essaibi George attended Bentley College, a business school in Waltham, Mass., for two years, before transferring to Boston University, where she was a political science major. While in college, she interned in the Washington, D.C. office of Max Baucus. After graduating from B.U., she worked as the Student Services Liaison at the Boston Private Industry Council.  She continued her education by earning a master's degree in education from the University of Massachusetts-Boston, later teaching social studies electives at East Boston High School from 2001 to 2014.

City Council career
Essaibi George is affiliated with the Democratic Party. She first ran unsuccessfully for Boston City Council in the 2013 at-large race. She became an at-large member of the Boston City Council in January 2016, following the 2015 at-large election; she was re-elected in November 2017 and November 2019.

While on the City Council, Essaibi George was considered an ally of then-Mayor Marty Walsh, whom she has known since childhood.

Essaibi George chaired committees, including both the Committee on Education and the Committee on Homelessness, Mental Health, and Recovery.

Essaibi George's successful 2015 campaign, which first elected her to the Boston City Council, focused on social services, including mental health counseling and services for the homeless. In 2016, she established the council's Homelessness, Mental Health, and Recovery committee. She was critical of Kim Janey's move in 2020, as city council president, to disestablish this committee. For several years, Essaibi George proposed ordinances requiring pharmacies to provide safe sharps waste disposal. An ordinance sponsored by Essaibi George that requires pharmacy chains with more than three locations in the city to do so was passed unanimously by the City Council in October 2020. Essaibi George also organized needle clean-up drives. In 2019, Essaibi George expressed her disapproval for the prospect of creating supervised consumption sites (in the mold of supervised injection sites) in response to drug use in the city. In 2019, Essaibi George advocated for the city to place a full-time social worker and a full-time nurse in every public school. The city, ultimately, implemented this, with Martin J. Valencia of The Boston Globe later attributing this, in part, to her advocacy on the matter.

Essaibi George was an early supporter of Ayanna Pressley's successful 2018 Democratic primary election challenge to incumbent U.S. congressman Mike Capuano. During the Democratic primary election of Massachusetts' 2020 United States Senate election, Essaibi George endorsed incumbent Ed Markey over challenger Joe Kennedy III.

In early 2021, amid the COVID-19 pandemic, she partnered with fellow city councilor Michelle Wu to propose a measure that would provide paid leave to municipal employees that feel ill after receiving the vaccine.

Essaibi George voted against legislation that was passed by the City Council which restricted the use of rubber bullets, tear gas, and pepper spray by the Boston Police Department.

In July 2021, amid her mayoral campaign, Essaibi George denied allegations made in an investigative article published in The Boston Globe that she had used her office to try to prevent the construction of a building that would block the views of a building owned by her husband, a real estate developer. If the allegations are true, they pose a potential violation of a state conflict of interest law.

In September 2021, a resolution authored by Councilor Lydia Edwards and co-sponsored by Essaibi George and Michelle Wu was passed by the City Council. The ordinance extends paid child leave for municipal employees to all forms of pregnancy loss, including abortion (as opposed to the existing law, which only covered loss of pregnancy by miscarriage), and also extends it to those welcoming a new family member or acting as a caregiver. The ordinance was signed into law by Acting Mayor Kim Janey soon after.

Mayoral campaign

On January 27, 2021, Essaibi George confirmed that she would run in the 2021 Boston mayoral election, considered a "wide open" race due to the then-expected confirmation of Mayor Walsh as United States Secretary of Labor; Walsh was confirmed to his Cabinet post in March.

Essaibi George was often described as a "centrist" or "moderate" candidate in comparison to the other candidates. Among her endorsers is former Boston police chief William G. Gross, who is also heading one of the two super PACs that backed her candidacy in the nonpartisan primary. That super PAC received $495,000 from New Balance owner and longtime Republican donor Jim Davis, who in 2016 contributed nearly $400,000 to the Trump Victory PAC. Her ties to Pro-Trump groups have resulted in some characterizing her as aligned with Trump or Republicans, which Essaibi George has denied.

As a candidate, Essaibi George touted her experience as an educator.

In the preliminary election on September 14, her campaign placed second with 22.4% of the vote, defeating acting mayor Kim Janey and several other challengers to advance to the general election with first-place winner Michelle Wu, who earned 33.4% of the vote.

Essaibi George was often described as a police-friendly candidate, compared to her opponents. On public safety and law enforcement, Essaibi George supports police reform. She is the only one of the election's five major candidates to oppose cutting the Boston Police Department's budget. She expressed her belief that the city needs to increase the size of its police force. Her public safety platform touted community policing as being beneficial. Essaibi George's campaign platform described gun violence as a "racial justice issue, a public health issue and a public safety issue".

Ellen Barry of The New York Times described Essaibi George as promising "more harmonious dealings" with developers than her opponents. Barry described Essaibi George's stances on development as one of the two greatest contrasts between her and her general election opponent Wu, who took stances on development and housing (such as Wu's support of rent control and dissolving the Boston Planning & Development Agency) that Essaibi George had criticized as strongly detrimental to development in the city. The other greatest contrast between Essaibi George and Wu, per Barry's opinion, was their aforementioned differences on whether to make cuts to police funding.

Essaibi George criticized her general election opponent as taking a policy approach that Essaibi George characterized as "abstract" and "academic".

On September 21, Essaibi George publicly urged super PACs to refrain from involvement in the general election. Her opponent Wu, the following day, publicly urged super PACs to refrain from negative campaigning. Essaibi George's public demand came in the aftermath of the Dorchester Reporter revealing Jim Davis' contributions to one of the super PACs supporting her candidacy.

In the general election, Essaibi George placed emphasis on the fact that she is a native Bostonian (her opponent, Wu, is originally from Chicago). During a radio interview, she declared her belief that it was "relevant" that she was a native Bostonian. Some pointed out that 57% of Bostonians were born outside of the state of Massachusetts. In addition, Essaibi George touted herself as having a different leadership style than her opponent, claiming that she makes herself more available to residents and community leaders. However, an early September 2021 poll had shown that more of the primary election's likely voters had personally met Wu than had personally met Essaibi George.

Essaibi George embarked on a "listen and learn" tour of various Boston neighborhoods, which she claimed would inform her "equity, inclusion and justice agenda". She released the resulting agenda on October 8.

Post-City Council career
In 2022, Essaibi George returned to her roots of teaching, working as a substitute teacher in Boston's public schools. She did so amid a shortage of substitute teachers in the city's schools. In April 2022, amid the 2022 Russian invasion of Ukraine, Essaibi George made a humanitarian trip to Poland to provide supplies to refugees near the Polish-Ukrainian border. In October 2022, Essaibi George was appointed president and chief operating officer of Big Sister Boston by the nonprofit's Board of Directors. She began her tenure on November 28, 2022.

Personal life
Essaibi George is the founder and owner of a retail store in Dorchester called Stitch House, which sells yarn and fabrics and offers classes in knitting, sewing, quilting and crochet. She is married to Doug George, a real estate developer. She and her husband have four sons, including a set of triplets.

Electoral history

City Council

 write-in votes

Mayor

Notes

References

Further reading

External links

Official campaign website
Annissa Essaibi George – City Councilor, At-Large | City of Boston

1973 births
Living people
21st-century American educators
21st-century American women educators
21st-century American politicians
21st-century American women politicians
American people of Tunisian descent
American politicians of Polish descent
Boston City Council members
Boston University College of Arts and Sciences alumni
Candidates in the 2021 United States elections
John D. O'Bryant School of Mathematics & Science alumni
Massachusetts Democrats
People from Dorchester, Massachusetts
Schoolteachers from Massachusetts
University of Massachusetts Boston alumni
Women city councillors in Massachusetts